"Stars" is the second single from Grace Potter and the Nocturnals' fourth studio album The Lion the Beast the Beat and a follow-up to "Never Go Back", their debut single from the album. "Stars" is track #4 on the album.

The Deluxe Edition of The Lion the Beast the Beat also contains an alternative country version performed as a duo by Grace Potter and country singer Kenny Chesney.

Music video
The music video was released on August 24, 2012. It was directed by Philip Andelman, who also directed for Taylor Swift and Beyoncé.

Commercial performance
As of February 20, 2013, the song has sold 183,000 copies in the US.

Critical reception
"Stars" was positively received by critics, deemed one of the best songs off the new album.

Personnel
Adapted credits from the booklet.

Main version
Grace Potter – lead vocals, keyboards, tambourine
Scott Tournet – acoustic guitar, lead guitar, lap steel guitar, loops, ambience 
Benny Yurco – electric guitar
Matt Burr – drums
Michael Libramento – bass guitar
David Campbell – string arrangements

Alternative country version
Grace Potter – lead vocals, Hammond organ
Pat Buchanan – electric guitar
Kenny Chesney – backing vocals
Chad Cromwell – drums
Dan Dugmore – steel guitar
Larry Franklin – fiddle
Kenny Greenberg – electric guitar
John Barlow Jarvis – piano
Alison Krauss – backing vocals
Michael Rhodes – bass guitar
Scott Tournet – electric guitar, acoustic guitar

Covers
Amanda Brown, a contestant from Team Adam Levine in the third season of the American The Voice performed it on November 19, 2012.

American Idol semi-finalist Nick Boddington performed "Stars" during the final round of Hollywood Week in Season 12. The episode aired on February 7, 2013.

Emily Piriz performed this song during Hollywood Week on season 13 of American Idol which aired on February 12, 2014.

 On October 5, 2015, Shelby Brown covered the song choice selection on The Voice (U.S. season 9).
 On November 25, 2019, Marybeth Byrd covered the song during Top 11 fan choice selection on The Voice (U.S season 17).

Charts

Weekly charts

Year-end charts

References

2012 songs
Grace Potter and the Nocturnals songs
Hollywood Records singles
Music videos directed by Philip Andelman
2012 singles